The Devil's Tower is a 1928 American silent western film directed by J.P. McGowan and starring Buddy Roosevelt, Thelma Parr and McGowan.

Cast
 Buddy Roosevelt as James Murdock
 Frank Earle as 	Tom Murdock
 J.P. McGowan as George Stilwell
 Thelma Parr as 	Doris Stilwell
 Art Rowlands as 	Phillip Wayne 
 Tom Bay as 	Dutch Haynes

References

Bibliography
 Munden, Kenneth White. The American Film Institute Catalog of Motion Pictures Produced in the United States, Part 1. University of California Press, 1997.

External links

1928 films
1928 Western (genre) films
1920s American films
Silent American Western (genre) films
Films directed by J. P. McGowan
American silent feature films
1920s English-language films
Rayart Pictures films